Thomas Wilson (16 April 1896 – 2 February 1948) was a footballer who was a member of the Huddersfield Town team that won the Football League three times in the 1920s.

Playing career

Born in Seaham, County Durham, Wilson started his professional career with Sunderland in 1914, before his career was interrupted by World War I. During the war he turned out for the Seaham Colliery side, before joining Huddersfield in 1919.

Over the next 12 seasons, he was a virtual ever-present with Huddersfield, helping them to the Football League championship in 1923–24, 1924–25, and 1925–26, as well as victory in the FA Cup in 1922. In his time at Huddersfield, they also reached the FA Cup finals in 1920, 1928 and 1930. He was Huddersfield's captain throughout most of this period, before handing over to Clem Stephenson, later to be the club's manager. Thomas Wilson was known as the "Gentleman of football" also titled as "The Dauntless Tommy Wilson" In the FA Cup Final 1930 vs Arsenal. Thomas Wilson also had a waxwork figure of himself created for that final and was displayed in Madame Tussauds.

He made one England appearance in a 5–1 defeat by Scotland on 31 March 1928.

He left Huddersfield in 1931, having made 448 league appearances (4 goals) and another 52 appearances in FA Cup matches. He spent one season at Blackpool before retiring in 1932. He then returned to Huddersfield as assistant trainer. After World War II, he joined Barnsley as a trainer where he remained until his death in 1948 at the age of 51.

Life outside football

Thomas Wilson had three sons: Thomas (Derek), Gordon and Neil.

Honours
Huddersfield Town

Football League Division 1 Championship: 1923–24, 1924–25 & 1925–26
Division 1 Runner-up: 1926–27 & 1927–28
Division 2 Runner-up: 1919–20
FA Cup Winner: 1922
FA Cup finalist: 1920, 1928 & 1930
FA Charity Shield: 1922

References

External links
England profile on englandstats.com
England profile on englandfc.com

1896 births
1948 deaths
Sportspeople from Seaham
Footballers from County Durham
English footballers
England international footballers
Association football central defenders
English Football League players
Sunderland A.F.C. players
Huddersfield Town A.F.C. players
Blackpool F.C. players
English Football League representative players
Huddersfield Town A.F.C. non-playing staff
Barnsley F.C. non-playing staff
FA Cup Final players